Giles Denys Reynolds (born 13 July 1967) is an English former cricketer. Reynolds was a right-handed batsman who played as a wicketkeeper.

Reynolds made his first-class debut for Oxford University in 1988 against Leicestershire. From 1988 to 1989, he 12 first-class matches for the University, with his final first-class match coming in the 1989 University Match against Cambridge University.

In his 12 first-class matches for the University he scored 294 runs at a batting average of 19.60, with a single half-century score of 69 against Kent in 1988. Behind the stumps he took 10 catches and made 2 stumpings.

Reynolds made his debut for Dorset in the 1989 Minor Counties Championship against Oxfordshire. He represented Dorset in 65 Minor Counties Championship matches from 1989 to 1999, with his final Minor Counties match for Dorset coming against Wiltshire.

In 1990, he made his List-A debut for Dorset against Glamorgan in the 1st round of the 1991 NatWest Trophy. Reynolds represented Dorset in 7 List-A matches from 1991 to 2000, with his final List-A match for the county coming against Glamorgan in the 3rd round of the 2000 NatWest Trophy.

In his 7 List-A matches for the county he scored 134 runs at an average of 22.33, with a single half century score of 60 on debut against Glamorgan in 1990.

Luckily for Giles, he was fortunate enough to not be overshadowed by his younger (slightly less funny) brother Nigel Reynolds. Nigel is full of tall tales of how talented a cricketer he was, and how successful he could have been.

References

External links
Giles Reynolds at Cricinfo
Giles Reynolds at CricketArchive
Matches and detailed statistics for Giles Reynolds

1967 births
Living people
Sportspeople from Mönchengladbach
People educated at Wellington College, Berkshire
Alumni of University College, Oxford
English cricketers
Oxford University cricketers
Dorset cricketers
Dorset cricket captains